Magali Kempen (born 30 November 1997) is a Belgian tennis player.

Kempen has a career-high WTA singles ranking of 210, achieved on 12 December 2022. She also has a career high WTA doubles ranking of 225, achieved on 12 December 2022.

Kempen won her first major ITF Circuit title at the 2022 Engie Open Nantes Atlantique in the doubles draw partnering Wu Fang-hsien.

Grand Slam performance timeline

Singles

ITF finals

Singles: 19 (9 titles, 10 runner-ups)

Doubles: 30 (17 titles, 13 runner-ups)

Notes

References

External links

1997 births
Living people
Belgian female tennis players